Jim "Builder" Walsh (1895 - 19 February 1950) was an Irish hurler who played as a centre-back for the Kilkenny and Dublin senior teams.

Walsh made his first appearance for the Kilkenny team during the 1916 championship, however, he later joined the Dublin team and was a regular player until his retirement after the 1930 championship. During that time he has won three All-Ireland medals, seven Leinster medals and one National Hurling League medal. Walsh was an All-Ireland runner-up on four occasions.

At club level Walsh began his career with Mooncoin, winning three county championship medals. He later played with Faughs in Dublin, winning a further five county championship medals.

Walsh also hurled at international level for Ireland. He was the only player to line out on three Tailteann Games hurling teams.

References

 

1895 births
1950 deaths
Mooncoin hurlers
Faughs hurlers
Kilkenny inter-county hurlers
Dublin inter-county hurlers
Leinster inter-provincial hurlers
All-Ireland Senior Hurling Championship winners
Ireland international hurlers
Irish builders